Proplacenticeras is a discoidal ammonite from the lower part of the Upper Cretaceous and precursor of the overall similar Placenticeras.

The shell is compressed, with flat or slightly convex sides and narrow flat venter, with or without slightly conical umbilical  tubercles, ventrolateral clavi and crescentic ribs on outer part of sides. Sutures are with fewer auxiliary elements than on latter Placenticeras.

Species in sequential order, starting with the oldest, include P. sutherlandbrowni, P. stantoni, P. pseudoplacenta, P. fritschi and P. kaffrarium;  sometimes identified as Placenticeras.

Proplacenticeras has a fairly wide distribution and is known from the western United States and Canada, Mexico, France, Spain, Angola, Israel, Madagascar, India and NE Central Asia.

References
 W.J. Arkell, et al., 1957.  Mesozoic Ammonoidea, Treatise on Invertebrate Paleontology Pat L Mollusca 4. Geological Society of America and University of Kansas Press.
William A Cobban & Stephen C. Hook. 1979. Collignoniceras woollgari woollgari (Mantell) ammonite fauna from Upper Cretaceous of Western Interior, United States.  Memoir 37. New Mexico Bureau of Mines & Mineral Resources.
  Proplacenticeras in Fossilworks.

Ammonitida genera
Placenticeratidae
Cretaceous ammonites
Ammonites of Europe